Wanderers Football Club is a senior rugby union club based in Dublin, Ireland, playing in Division 2B of the All-Ireland League. It is one of the oldest rugby clubs in Ireland, however its exact date of foundation is open to question.  In 1860 a team by the name of Wanderers played against Dublin University. However the current team gives its foundation date as 1870. While the link between the two teams is unclear, they both seem to have been founded by former Dublin University players. In 1879 Wanderers were among the founding members of the Irish Rugby Football Union. They have also regularly provided international players for Ireland, including five captains. In 1959, Ronnie Dawson also went on to captain the British and Irish Lions. They have also provided one captain each for both England and Australia.

Since 1880 Wanderers have shared Lansdowne Road with Lansdowne Football Club, with each club having their own clubhouse at opposite ends of the ground. However, since 1974 the ground itself has been owned by the IRFU.

Notable players

Ireland
At least 87 Wanderers players have represented Ireland. These include the following:

 Ned Byrne
 Padraig Kenny
 Thomas Crean
 Ronnie Dawson
 Tony Ensor
 Kevin Flynn
 Mike Gibson
 Bob Graves
Gary Halpin
 Frederick Harvey
 Robert Johnston
 Ronnie Kavanagh
 Phil Matthews
 Robbie McGrath
 Paul McNaughton
 Andy Mulligan
 Paul Murray
 Bethel Solomons
 Mark Sugden
 Kelvin Leahy
 Joseph Wallace
 Freddie McLennan

British and Irish Lions
As well as representing Ireland, several Wanderers players have also represented the British and Irish Lions. These include:

 Andrew Clinch: 1896
 Thomas Crean: 1896
 Robert Johnston: 1896
 Robertson Smyth: 1903 
 Joseph Wallace: 1903
 James Wallace: 1903
 Paul Murray: 1930
 Bob Graves: 1938
 Ronnie Dawson: 1959
 Andy Mulligan: 1959
 Mike Gibson: 1966, 1968, 1971, 1974, 1977

Other internationals
  Pat Howard
  Andrew Slack
  Jack Gregory
  Bob Gemmill
  Peter Dalton Young

Ireland coaches
 Ronnie Dawson
 Roly Meates
 Gerry Murphy

Victoria Cross
Three former Wanderers players and Ireland internationals have also been awarded the Victoria Cross. Crean and Johnston served with the British Army during the Second Boer War while Harvey served with the Canadian Army during the First World War.

 Thomas Crean
 Frederick Harvey
 Robert Johnston

Honours

 Leinster Senior League
Winners: 1885, 1888, 1894 1906, 1911, 1947, 1954, 1959, 1973, 1978, 1982, 1984, 1990: 13
Leinster Senior Cup
Winners: 1973, 1976, 1979, 1985, 1990 :  5
Leinster Club Senior League Shield
Winners: 2014-15:  1
Metropolitan Cup
Winners: 1924, 1954, 1986, 1987, 1992:  5

References

External links
 Wanderers FC Rugby

 
Rugby clubs established in 1870
Irish rugby union teams
Rugby union clubs in Dublin (city)
1870 establishments in Ireland
Senior Irish rugby clubs (Leinster)